Limehouse Basin Lock is a lock forming the exit from Limehouse Basin to the Thames, in the London Borough of Tower Hamlets, England. It is the final lock on the Regent's Canal. The Narrow Street swing bridge sits between the lock and the river.

The current lock was built in 1989 for yachts and pleasure craft, to conserve water in the Basin. The original gate-recesses and one of the gates remain in situ, to demonstrate the size of the former lock.

The nearest Docklands Light Railway station is Limehouse.

See also

Canals of the United Kingdom
History of the British canal system

References

Locks on the Regent's Canal
Geography of the London Borough of Tower Hamlets
Buildings and structures in the London Borough of Tower Hamlets
Limehouse